"It's Alright Now" is a single by UK band The Beloved.

Critical reception
Music & Media commented, "Soft-spoken vocals and basic beats and basslines produce a song that is very close to New Order-type of moody dance pop." Nick Robinson from Music Week wrote that this track finds the duo "retouching a track that doesn't sound that dissimilar to their previous singles and recent works by fellow Mancunians Cabaret Voltaire. Undemanding, mellow house grooves that sort of drift in and out with a degree of style. A hit but not a big one."

Music video
The music video for this song features Jon Marsh and Steve Waddington travelling on the London Underground, intercut with footage of Jon Marsh riding in a hot-air balloon. The song was also promoted live on the UK music program Dance Energy, which included a then-unknown Geri Halliwell dancing amongst the studio audience.

Track listings
 CD single
 "It's Alright Now" — 4:10
 "It's Alright Now" (Rattling Good Time) — 8:12
 "It's Alright Now" (Back To Basics Instrumental) — 5:38

 7" single
 "It's Alright Now" — 4:15
 "Scarlet Beautiful" (Naked & Foxy) — 4:10 		
			
 12" single
 "It's Alright Now" (Rattling Good Time) — 8:12
 "It's Alright Now" (Back To Basics) — 5:36
 "It's Alright Now" (Feeling Fine) — 5:34

 Cassette single
 "It's Alright Now" — 4:15
 "Scarlet Beautiful" (Naked & Foxy) — 4:10

Charts

References

1990 singles
The Beloved (band) songs
1990 songs
Songs written by Jon Marsh